Thimmanagar is a village that comes under Pitlam mandal in the Nizamabad District of Andhra Pradesh, India. It is 75 km away from Nizamabad and 150 km away from Hyderabad. It is just 3 km away from Pitlam.

The people of this village are mainly dependent on Agriculture and but some families are succeeding in business. Paddy and Sugar cane are the major crops cultivated, and the village has a population of around 3000. The Veer Hanuman temple is Thimmanagar's most visited place, and it is related to the Hindu religion. The nearest visiting places are Nizamsagar reservoir and Nallavaag dam.

In 2017 Gouda Sangam has built Renuka Yellamma Temple and this temple has become very powerful and famous.
Vittal Goud Thadakanti from this village has led the Gouda Sangam to construct the Renuka Yellamma Temple. Every Year in March Yellama Jathara happens.

Villages in Nizamabad district